The 1994 James Hardie 12 Hour was an endurance race for production cars held at the Mount Panorama Circuit,  Bathurst, New South Wales, Australia on 3 April 1994. It was the fourth running of the "Bathurst 12 Hour".
The race was open to cars of which at least ten examples had been sold and registered for use on Australian roads. Modifications in line with Group 3E Series Production Cars regulations, as published by the Confederation of Australian Motor Sport, were permitted.

The race was won by Gregg Hansford and Neil Crompton driving a Mazda RX-7 for BP Mazda Motorsport.

Class structure
The field for the event was divided into the following seven classes:
 Class A : Small cars up to 1850cc
 Class B : Medium cars 1801-2500cc
 Class C : Large cars 2601-4000cc
 Class S : Sports Cars up to 2200cc
 Class T : Turbo and four-wheel-drive cars
 Class V : V8 engines / high performance six cylinder cars
 Class X : Extra high performance cars

Results

Notes
 Pole Position: Mark Skaife (Mazda RX-7), 2m 32.4837s
 Race time of winning car: 12h 1m 21.3868s
 Winning margin: 1m 15.6047s

References

Motorsport in Bathurst, New South Wales
James Hardie 12 Hour